Bian Ka (卞卡, born 5 January 1993) is a Chinese athlete specialising in the shot put. She represented her country at the 2016 World Indoor Championships finishing tenth.

Her personal bests in the event are 18.71 metres outdoors (Suzhou 2015) and 18.12 metres indoors (Beijing 2016).

Competition record

References

External links 
 
 
 
 

1993 births
Living people
Chinese female shot putters
Place of birth missing (living people)
Athletes (track and field) at the 2016 Summer Olympics
Olympic athletes of China